

List and changes

2000 establishment
The original shadow cabinet was established after MDC had gained the largest number of non-majority seats in parliament in that year's election.
 Giles Mutsekwa, Defence
 Welshman Ncube, Home Affairs
 Tendai Biti, Foreign Affairs
 David Coltart, Justice
 Tapiwa Mashakada, Finance and Economic Planning
 Fidelis Mhashu, Education
 Evylin Masaiti, Gender, Youth and Culture
 Hilda Suka Mafudze, Environment and Tourism
 Renson Gasela, Lands and Agriculture

2008 reshuffle
 David Coltart, Legal and Constitutional Affairs
 Blessing Chebundo, Health and Child Welfare
 Giles Mutsekwa, Security and Defence
 Fidelis Mhashu, Education
 Priscilla Misihairabwi, Foreign Affairs
 Gabriel Chibva, Local Government
 Renson Gasela, Lands, Agriculture and Natural Affairs
 Evelyn Masaiti, Gender, Youth and Culture
 Murisi Zvizvayi, Energy, Transport and Communications
 Paurina Mpariwa, Public Service, Labour and Social Security
 Joel Gabuza, Mines
 Tapiwa Mashakada, Budget, Finance and Economic Planning
 Tendai Biti, Home Affairs
 Paul Themba Nyathi, Information (non-MP)
 Edwin Mushoriwa, Environment and Tourism
 Milford Gwetu, Industry and Commerce

2009 reshuffle
A reshuffle occurred on November 12, 2009.
 David Coltart, Legal and Constitutional Affairs
 Blessing Chebundo, Health and Child Welfare
 Giles Mutsekwa, Security and Defence
 Fidelis Mhashu, Education
 Trudy Stevenson, Local Government
 Moses Mzila Ndlovu, Foreign Affairs
 Murisi Zvizvayi, Energy, Transport and Communications
 Paurina Mpariwa, Public Service, Labour and Social Security
 Joel Gabuza, Mines
 Editor Matamisa, Gender, Youth and Culture
 Edward Mukosi, Lands, Agriculture and Natural Affairs
 Tapiwa Mashakada, Budget, Finance and Economic Planning
 Tendai Biti, Home Affairs
 Paul Themba Nyathi, Information (non-MP)
 Edwin Mushoriwa, Environment and Tourism
 Milford Gwetu, Industry and Commerce

References

Movement for Democratic Change